The Palestine national handball team is the national handball team of Palestine.

Asian Championship record
1977 – 7th place
1979 – 4th place
1987 – 10th place

References

External links
IHF profile

Men's national handball teams
H